I-166 may refer to:
Prototype of the Polikarpov I-180 fighter aircraft
Japanese submarine I-166, a Kaidai-class submarine